The following highways and routes are numbered 135:

Australia 

  Hendy Main Road

Brazil
 BR-135

Canada
 Winnipeg Route 135
 New Brunswick Route 135
 Ontario Highway 135 (former)
 Prince Edward Island Route 135
 Saskatchewan Highway 135

Costa Rica
 National Route 135

India
 National Highway 135 (India)

Japan
 Japan National Route 135

United Kingdom
 A135 road

United States
 Interstate 135
 Alabama State Route 135
 Arkansas Highway 135
 California State Route 135
 Colorado State Highway 135
 Connecticut Route 135
 Florida State Road 135 (former)
 County Road 135 (Columbia County, Florida)
 County Road 135 (Hamilton County, Florida)
 Georgia State Route 135
 Hawaii Route 135
 Illinois Route 135
 Indiana State Road 135
 Iowa Highway 135 (former)
 K-135 (Kansas highway) (former)
 Kentucky Route 135
 Louisiana Highway 135
 Maine State Route 135
 Maryland Route 135
 Massachusetts Route 135
 M-135 (Michigan highway) (former)
 Minnesota State Highway 135
 Missouri Route 135
 Montana Highway 135
 Nebraska Highway 135 (former)
 New Hampshire Route 135
 New Mexico State Road 135 (former)
 New York State Route 135
 County Route 135 (Herkimer County, New York)
 County Route 135 (Niagara County, New York)
 County Route 135 (Schenectady County, New York)
 County Route 135 (Tompkins County, New York)
 County Route 135 (Westchester County, New York)
 North Carolina Highway 135
 Ohio State Route 135
 Oklahoma State Highway 135
 Pennsylvania Route 135 (former)
 South Carolina Highway 135
 Tennessee State Route 135
 Texas State Highway 135
 Texas State Highway Spur 135
 Farm to Market Road 135
 Utah State Route 135
 Utah State Route 135 (1933-1969) (former)
 Utah State Route 135 (1969-1992) (former)
 Virginia State Route 135
 Virginia State Route 135 (1930-1933) (former)
 Virginia State Route 135 (1933-1945) (former)
 Wisconsin Highway 135 (former)
 Wyoming Highway 135

Territories
 Puerto Rico Highway 135